Sergey Gavryushin (born 27 June 1959) is a former track and field athlete for the Soviet Union who competed in the shot put. This ranked him only fifth for the year but placed him in the all-time top ten for the event. This mark continues to rank highly and places Gavryushin within the all-time top 20 athletes, as of 2016. He also ranked seventh and sixth in the global seasonal lists for 1987 and 1988, respectively.

Given the high standard of men's throws in the Soviet Union during this period, Gavryushin only competed at three major international events. His sole major medal came on home turf at the 1986 Goodwill Games in Moscow, where he was a silver medallist in a Soviet 1–2 finish behind Sergey Smirnov.

International competitions

National titles
Soviet Athletics Championships
Shot put: 1988

References

External links

Living people
1958 births
Soviet male shot putters
World Athletics Championships athletes for the Soviet Union
Goodwill Games medalists in athletics
Competitors at the 1986 Goodwill Games